Israel Robert Lehman (born October 5, 1924) is a Lithuanian-born American biochemist who is an emeritus professor of biochemistry at the Stanford University School of Medicine. He made major contributions in characterizing the process of homologous recombination.

Early life and education

Lehman was born in Tauragė, Lithuania in 1924 and emigrated to United States in 1927. After serving as a soldier during World War II, he was educated at Johns Hopkins University, earning a bachelor's degree in 1950 and completing his Ph.D. in 1954.

Career
During his postdoctoral research, he became a co-discoverer of DNA polymerase. He taught briefly at Washington University in St. Louis before moving to Stanford in 1959. At Stanford, he served two terms as chair of biochemistry, and became William Hume Professor in 1980.

He was elected to the National Academy of Sciences in 1977,
and was president of the American Society for Biochemistry and Molecular Biology for 1997.

References

1924 births
Living people
American biochemists
American people of Lithuanian-Jewish descent
Johns Hopkins University alumni
Washington University in St. Louis faculty
Stanford University faculty
Members of the United States National Academy of Sciences
Lithuanian emigrants to the United States
People from Tauragė